S.O.B. is a 1981 American satirical black comedy film written and directed by Blake Edwards. It stars Julie Andrews, Richard Mulligan, Robert Preston, Larry Hagman, Robert Vaughn, Robert Webber, Loretta Swit, Shelley Winters and William Holden in his final film role. The film was produced by Lorimar and was released by Paramount Pictures on July 1, 1981.

Plot
The story is a satire of the film industry and Hollywood society. The main character, Felix Farmer (Richard Mulligan), is a phenomenally successful film producer who has just made the first major flop of his career, resulting in the loss of millions of dollars to his movie studio and his own sanity. Felix attempts suicide four times: He attempts to die of carbon monoxide poisoning in his car, only to have it accidentally slip into gear and crash through the side of his garage, down a sand dune and into the Pacific Ocean. He then attempts to hang himself from a rafter in an upstairs bedroom, only to fall and crash through the floor, injuring a poisonous Hollywood gossip columnist standing in the room below. Subsequently, he tries to gas himself in his kitchen oven, but is prevented from carrying out his intent by two party guests with other things on their mind.

Felix spends roughly the first quarter of the film in a catatonic state or heavily sedated while his friends and hangers-on occupy his Malibu beach house. The occupation leads to a party which degenerates into an orgy. Finally, he tries to shoot himself with a police officer's gun, but is prevented from doing so by the ministrations of a young woman wearing only a pair of panties. The experience gives him the sudden realization that the reason for his film's failure was its lack of sex.

Felix resolves to save both the film and his reputation. He persuades the studio to sell him the rights to the film and then tries to convince his wife Sally Miles (Julie Andrews), an Oscar-winning movie star with a squeaky-clean image, to appear in the revised film - a soft-core pornographic musical in which she must appear topless. He liquidates most of his financial holdings to buy the existing footage and to finance further production. If he fails, both he and Sally will be impoverished, at least by Hollywood standards.

At first the studio executives are keen to unload the film onto Felix and recoup their investment, but when Sally goes through with the topless scene and the film seems a likely success, they plot to regain control. Using California's community property laws, they persuade Sally to sign a  distribution deal which also gives the studio the right to edit the film. An angry and deranged Felix tries to steal the film negatives from the studio's color lab vault. Armed with his son's water pistol, Felix takes the lab's manager (Hamilton Camp) hostage. Hysterical, Felix points the water pistol at police; the police shoot and kill Felix, believing the toy gun to be real.

Felix's tragic death creates a crisis for his cronies Tim Culley (William Holden), the director of Night Wind; Ben Coogan (Robert Webber), Sally's press agent; and Dr. Irving Finegarten (Robert Preston), Felix and Sally's physician; the trio plan to save their friend from the lavish but hypocritical Hollywood funeral and give Felix a proper sendoff. They steal his body from the funeral home, substituting the corpse of a once popular but largely forgotten character actor who died on the beach near the Farmer home in the first scene of the film. After toasting their fallen comrade, the three give Felix a Viking funeral in a burning dinghy, while the actor gets the elaborate Hollywood sendoff many thought he deserved.

The epilogue later reveals that Felix's revamped film was a box office smash for the studio and Sally won another Academy Award for her performance.

The movie within the movie
Little is seen of the movie which is the focus of the plot, except for an extended dream sequence and a brief shot close to the end. The title is Night Wind, which provokes the headline "Critics Break Wind" seen on a copy of Variety at the start of S.O.B. after the initial flop. The plot of Night Wind is kept vague; it involves a frigid businesswoman (played by Sally) whose inability to love a "male chauvinist" rival executive stems from a childhood trauma that led to her sexual detachment.

The climax of Night Wind is the first scene of S.O.B., an elaborate song and dance sequence set to "Polly Wolly Doodle", in which Sally wanders through a room full of giant toys (several of which come to life), singing the song while dressed as a tomboy. The implication is that her father's death caused Andrews's character to renounce childhood and become a cold, frigid person.

A second scene, taking place at the end of the film, has Sally's character arrive at the home of her would-be lover after the dream, where he reveals that he still loves her, "despite everything."

When Felix rewrites the film to make it into soft porn, changes are made: Sally's character goes from sexually frigid to being a nymphomaniac. Her lover goes from male chauvinist to being a secret cross dresser. Felix axes the entire song sequence, turning it from a dream to a hallucination "... caused by a powerful aphrodisiac put into her Bosco" and replacing the regular version of "Polly Wolly Doodle" with a more haunting version. He has the "toys" dress in more erotic outfits, and includes a carnival barker-type muscle man (portrayed by S.O.B.'''s choreographer, Paddy Stone), who tempts Andrews' character before she rejects him by flashing her breasts.

Cast

 Julie Andrews as Sally Miles, the star of Night Wind and the wife of film producer Felix Farmer
 William Holden as Tim Culley, the director of Night Wind and Felix's best friend
 Richard Mulligan as Felix Farmer, the producer of Night Wind and the husband of Sally Miles
 Robert Preston as Dr. Irving Finegarten, Felix and Sally's physician
 Robert Webber as Ben Coogan, Sally's press agent
 Robert Vaughn as David Blackman, the president of Capitol Studios
 Larry Hagman as Dick Benson, a Capitol studios executive and Blackman's right-hand man
 Marisa Berenson as Mavis, an actress and mistress to David Blackman
 Stuart Margolin as Gary Murdock, Sally's personal secretary and an aspiring producer
 Loretta Swit as Polly Reed, a Hollywood gossip columnist
 Craig Stevens as Willard Pratt, Polly Reed's henpecked husband
 Shelley Winters as Eva Brown, Sally's agent
 Robert Loggia as Herb Maskowitz, Sally's lawyer
 Jennifer Edwards as Lila, a young hitchhiker picked up by Culley
 Rosanna Arquette as Babs, Lila's friend, also picked up by Culley
 John Lawlor as the Capitol Studios Manager
 John Pleshette as the Capitol Studios Vice-president
 Ken Swofford as Harold P. Harrigan, a studio security guard
 Hamilton Camp as Lipschitz, an executive at Capitol Color Lab, where the negative of Night Wind is stored.
 Paul Stewart as Harry Sandler, Felix's agent
 Benson Fong as Felix and Sally's personal chef
 Larry Storch as Professor Krishna Mansa Kesari, Sally Miles' spiritual guru, who officiates at Felix's funeral.
 Mimi Davis as Joyce Benson, Dick's wife and Sandler's daughter
 David Young as Sam Marshall, a popular young actor
 Byron Kane as the Funeral Director
 Virginia Gregg as the Funeral Director's Wife
 Herb Tanney as Burgess Webster (as Stiffe Tanney)
 Joe Penny as Officer Buchwald, a police officer called to the Farmer residence
 Erica Yohn as Agnes, the costume designer of Night Wind Colleen Brennan as Tammy Taylor (as Katherine MacMurray)
 Charles Lampkin as Felix and Sally's Butler
 Bert Rosario as the Mexican Gardener
 Gene Nelson as Clive Lytell 

Title
"S.O.B." (in the film) stands for "Standard Operational Bullshit" and refers to misinformation being the norm.  The abbreviation means "sexually oriented business" (if pertaining to strip clubs) and more generally "son of a bitch" (a ruthless person).

A Spanish dub of the film keeps the abbreviation S.O.B., claiming that it stands for "Sois hOnrados Bandidos" (You Are Honest Crooks). The Argentine title for the movie was changed to Se acabó el mundo (The World is Ended), having no relation to the original title.

Three years later, when Edwards had his name removed from the writing credits of 1984's City Heat, he was billed under the pseudonym Sam O. Brown. (S.O.B.)

Influences
When writing the screenplay, Edwards drew upon several of his own experiences as a film maker. The character of Felix Farmer is a person not unlike Edwards, while actress Sally Miles bears certain similarities to real-life wife Julie Andrews (who plays her).

The story of S.O.B. parallels the experiences of Edwards and Andrews in their infamous, but Academy Award-nominated, failure, Darling Lili. Intended to reveal Andrews' heretofore unseen wicked and sexy side, that film had a troubled shoot, went significantly over budget, and was subjected to post-production studio interference. The early 1970s brought more bad news for Edwards; he made two more films, Wild Rovers, a western with William Holden, and The Carey Treatment with James Coburn. Once again, the studio interfered in the post-production of both films, which were edited without any input from Edwards. Both movies opened to negative reviews and poor business. Hit hard financially and personally by these events, Edwards moved to Europe to work independently, away from the meddling and restrictions of the Hollywood studios. The plan worked, leading to several successful projects including three very profitable Pink Panther sequels starring Peter Sellers.

In S.O.B., Andrews's character agrees (with some pharmaceutical persuasion) to "show my boobies" in a scene in the film-within-the-film. For this scene, comedian Johnny Carson thanked Andrews on the Academy Awards for "showing us that the hills were still alive," alluding to a famous line from The Sound of Music opening sequence.

ProductionS.O.B.  had been in development by Edwards since 1976. In 1979, the film was set for pre-production at Orion Pictures with distribution by Warner Bros., Edwards's third film with Orion after 10 and The Ferret, which was due to star Dudley Moore. In July 1979, Orion put the film into turnaround. Later in 1979, Edwards signed a deal with Lorimar through United Artists set to distribute. In 1981, Lorimar's agreement with UA ended and a distribution deal with Paramount Pictures was made even though there were was still much animosity between Edwards and Paramount over the Darling Lili debacle.

Filming took place between March and July 1980 in Los Angeles, Malibu and Santa Monica on a budget of $12 million.

Reception
Critical responseS.O.B. was released in July 1981, with critical opinion of the film sharply divided. Remarkably, the screenplay was nominated for both a Writers Guild of America Award for Best Comedy Written Directly for the Screen, and a Razzie Award for Worst Screenplay. It was also nominated for a Razzie for Worst Director and a Golden Globe Award for Best Motion Picture – Comedy/Musical.S.O.B. currently holds an 81% approval rating on Rotten Tomatoes from 26 reviews, with an average rating of 6.90/10. The website's critical consensus reads, "A sustained blast of unbridled vitriol from writer-director Blake Edwards, S.O.B. is one of the blackest – and most consistently funny – Hollywood satires ever put to film."

Vincent Canby, writing for The New York Times, described S.O.B. as 'a nasty, biased, self-serving movie that also happens to be hilarious most of the time...It's difficult to remember a film as mean-spirited as S.O.B. that also was so consistently funny.' Roger Ebert and Gene Siskel, then hosts of the PBS film review program Sneak Previews, both gave S.O.B. a positive review.

Box office
The film grossed $3,116,078 over the 5-day 4th of July holiday weekend and went on to gross $14.8 million in the United States and Canada. The Village Voice dubbed the film a box office flop.

Television version
Broadcast television prints of S.O.B. contain alternate takes and edits of several scenes originally containing sex and nudity, such as the party and orgy scenes and  Night Wind''s erotica dream sequence where Julie Andrews exposes her breasts. The television version contains a scene where Robert Vaughn, as studio head David Blackman, receives a phone call while in bed with his mistress, and is simply seen naked from the waist up.  In the original theatrical print, he is wearing a bustier, nylon stockings and other transvestite paraphernalia.

Home media
The original video release was made by CBS Video Enterprises in 1982, on both VHS and CED Videodisc, and was later reissued on VHS by CBS/Fox Video in the mid-1980s. Warner Bros. bought ancillary rights in 1989 with their purchase of Lorimar, and the film was released on Laserdisc through Warner Home Video in 1990. Warners released a DVD edition in 2002 and reissued in 2012.

References

Notes

  Each page is not identified.

Citations

Sources

External links

1981 films
1980s sex comedy films
American satirical films
American sex comedy films
1980s English-language films
Films scored by Henry Mancini
Films directed by Blake Edwards
Films with screenplays by Blake Edwards
Films about film directors and producers
Films about Hollywood, Los Angeles
Films set in Los Angeles
Paramount Pictures films
1981 comedy films
1980s American films